Juan Carlos Romero Bernal (born 15 December 1977 in Zacatecas, Zacatecas, México) is a Mexican long-distance runner who competed in the 2008 Summer Olympics.

Personal bests

Outdoor
1500 m: 3:47.41 min –  Monterrey, 12 March 2010
3000m: 8:14.68 min –  Ponce, 27 May 2006
5000m: 13:29.40 min –  Walnut, California, 15 April 2011
10,000m: 27:47.46 min –  Stanford, California, 4 May 2008
Half marathon: 1:01:48 hrs –  Birmingham, 11 October 2009
Marathon: 2:14:47 hrs –  Torreón, 4 March 2012

Competition record

References

External links

Tilastopaja biography

1977 births
Living people
Mexican male long-distance runners
Olympic athletes of Mexico
Athletes (track and field) at the 2008 Summer Olympics
Sportspeople from Zacatecas
Pan American Games medalists in athletics (track and field)
Pan American Games silver medalists for Mexico
Central American and Caribbean Games gold medalists for Mexico
Athletes (track and field) at the 2011 Pan American Games
Competitors at the 2006 Central American and Caribbean Games
Competitors at the 2010 Central American and Caribbean Games
Competitors at the 2014 Central American and Caribbean Games
Central American and Caribbean Games medalists in athletics
Medalists at the 2011 Pan American Games
21st-century Mexican people